Conor McCormack may refer to:

 Conor McCormack (hurler)
 Conor McCormack (footballer)